Sir Theodore Martin  (16 September 1816 – 18 August 1909) was a Scottish poet, biographer, and translator.

Biography

Martin was the son of James Martin, a solicitor in Edinburgh, where Theodore was born and educated at the Royal High School and University. He practised as a solicitor in Edinburgh 1840–45, after which he went to London and became head of the firm of Martin and Leslie, parliamentary agents.

His first contribution to literature was the humorous Bon Gaultier Ballads, written along with W.E. Aytoun, which remained popular for a long time; originally contributed to a magazine, they appeared in book form in 1845.

Martin's translations include Dante's Vita Nuova, Oehlenschläger's Correggio and Aladdin, Heinrich Heine's Poems and Ballads, Friedrich Schiller's Wilhelm Tell, and Hertz's King René's Daughter.  He also published a complete translation of Horace with a Life, and one of Catullus.

He is probably best known for his Life of the Prince Consort (1874–80), the writing of which was entrusted to him by Queen Victoria, a work which won him her lifelong friendship.  He also wrote Lives of Professor Aytoun and Lord Lyndhurst.

In 1851 he married Helena Faucit, a well-known actress, and author of studies on Shakespeare's Female Characters, whose Life he published in 1901. The couple lived for some time at Bryntysilio {The Hill of St. Tyssilio} which he bought in 1861, near Llangollen, where in 1889 they were visited by the queen during her progress in Wales.

Martin kept up his intellectual activity into old age, published in 1905 a translation of Leopardi's poems, and Monographs (1906).  He was Lord Rector of St. Andrews 1881, LL.D. of Edinburgh 1875, and Knight Commander of the Order of the Bath 1880.

He died in 1909 and is buried in Brompton Cemetery, London.

References

Sources

External links

 
 
 

1816 births
1909 deaths
Alumni of the University of Edinburgh
People educated at the Royal High School, Edinburgh
Writers from Edinburgh
Scottish poets
Scottish biographers
Knights Commander of the Order of the Bath
Knights Commander of the Royal Victorian Order
Burials at Brompton Cemetery
Rectors of the University of St Andrews
19th-century poets